The 2012 Wofford Terriers football team represented Wofford College in the 2012 NCAA Division I FCS football season. They were led by 25th year head coach Mike Ayers and played their home games at Gibbs Stadium. They were a member of the Southern Conference (SoCon). They finished the season 9–4, 6–2 in SoCon play to claim a share of the conference championship with Appalachian State and Georgia Southern. They received an at-large bid into the FCS Playoffs where they defeated New Hampshire in the second round before falling in the quarterfinals to North Dakota State.

Schedule

Source: Schedule

Ranking movements

References

Wofford
Wofford Terriers football seasons
Southern Conference football champion seasons
Wofford
Wofford Terriers football